The Detroit Tigers are a Major League Baseball franchise based in Detroit, Michigan. They play in the American League Central division. Pitchers for the Tigers have thrown eight no-hitters in franchise history. A no-hitter is officially recognized by Major League Baseball only "when a pitcher (or pitchers) allows no hits during the entire course of a game, which consists of at least nine innings. In a no-hit game, a batter may reach base via a walk, an error, a hit by pitch, a passed ball or wild pitch on strike three, or catcher's interference." No-hitters of less than nine complete innings were previously recognized by the league as official; however, several rule alterations in 1991 changed the rule to its current form. A perfect game, a special subcategory of no-hitter, has yet to be thrown in Tigers history. As defined by Major League Baseball, "in a perfect game, no batter reaches any base during the course of the game." This feat came closest on June 2, 2010 when Armando Galarraga lost his perfect game bid against the Cleveland Indians with two outs in the ninth due to the incorrect call made by a first base umpire Jim Joyce. But there are two other times when the Tigers perfect game bids were lost with two outs in the ninth, one in 1932 and the other in 1983. The Tigers lead all franchises with three perfect game bids lost with two outs in the ninth.

George Mullin threw the first no-hitter in Tigers history on July 4, 1912; the most recent no-hitter was thrown by Spencer Turnbull on May 18, 2021. All eight Tigers no-hitters were thrown by right-handers. Virgil Trucks and Verlander are the only pitchers in Tigers history to throw more than one no-hitter. Three no-hitters were thrown at home and four on the road. They threw one in April, two in May, one in June, two in July, and one in August. The longest interval between no-hitters was between the games pitched by Mullin and Trucks, encompassing 39 years, 10 months, and 11 days from July 4, 1912 till May 15, 1952. Conversely, the shortest interval between no-hitters was between the both games pitched by Trucks, encompassing merely 3 months and 10 days from May 15, 1952 till August 25, 1952. The opponents no-hit by the Tigers are St. Louis Browns (now Baltimore Orioles), Washington Senators (now Minnesota Twins), New York Yankees, Boston Red Sox, Chicago White Sox, Milwaukee Brewers, Toronto Blue Jays, and the Seattle Mariners. None of those no-hitters which the team allowed at least a run. The most baserunners allowed in a no-hitter were by Trucks (his first no-hitter in 1952) and Morris (in 1984), who each allowed six. Of the seven no-hitters, two have been won by a score of 1–0 and two by the score of 4–0, more common than any other results. The largest margin of victory in a no-hitter was a 9–0 win by Verlander in 2011. The smallest margin of victory was two 1–0 wins by Trucks both in 1952.

The umpire is also an integral part of any no-hitter. The task of the umpire in a baseball game is to make any decision "which involves judgment, such as, but not limited to, whether a batted ball is fair or foul, whether a pitch is a strike or a ball, or whether a runner is safe or out… [the umpire's judgment on such matters] is final." Part of the duties of the umpire making calls at home plate includes defining the strike zone, which is defined as the "area over home plate the upper limit of which is a horizontal line at the midpoint between the top of the shoulders and the top of the uniform pants, and the lower level is a line at the hollow beneath the kneecap." These calls define every baseball game and are therefore integral to the completion of any no-hitter. A different umpire presided over each of the Tigers' eight no-hitters.

The manager is another integral part of any no-hitter. The tasks of the manager include determining the starting rotation as well as batting order and defensive lineup every game. Managers choosing the right pitcher and right defensive lineup at a right game at a right place at a right time would lead to a no-hitter. Jim Leyland is the only Tigers manager to skipper more than one no-hitter, being at the helm for both of Verlander's.

No-hitters

See also
Armando Galarraga's near-perfect game
List of Major League Baseball no-hitters

References

No-hitters
Lists of Major League Baseball no-hitters by franchise